Deadly Intentions is a 1985 American made-for-television thriller film starring Michael Biehn, Madolyn Smith and Cloris Leachman. A sequel titled Deadly Intentions... Again? was released in 1991.

Plot

Charles Raynor, is the outwardly "perfect" doctor husband of Katherine. But Raynor is actually a psychopath, who is carefully plotting the murder of his wife. As the horrible truth slowly dawns upon Katherine, she must find some way to prevent her murder—and to alert disbelieving authorities of her husband's duplicity.

Cast
 Michael Biehn as Charles Raynor
 Madolyn Smith as Katherine Raynor
 Cloris Leachman as Charlotte Raynor
 Morgana King as Anna Livanos
 Jack Kruschen as Alex Livanos
 Kevin McCarthy as Reichman
 Cliff DeYoung as Garner
 Edward Edwards as Tom Horner
 Bruce French as Dr. Reston
 Robert Clarke as Pharmacist
 Dennis Haskins as Airline Attendant
 Kimberly Beck as Sally Raynor
 Michael Currie as Dr. Lawrence
 Sagan Lewis as Barbara

Inspiration
Based on a true story, Deadly Intentions first took shape as a book by William Randolph Stevens.

See also
 List of television films produced for American Broadcasting Company

External links
 

1985 television films
1985 films
1985 thriller films
ABC network original films
Films directed by Noel Black
American thriller television films
1980s American films